may refer to several railway stations in Japan
 Fuchū Station (Hiroshima) 	
 Fuchū Station (Tokyo)